Eric Boswell may refer to:

 Eric Boswell (songwriter) (1921–2009), songwriter known for the Christmas song "Little Donkey"
 Eric J. Boswell (born 1945), United States Assistant Secretary of State for Diplomatic Security